The 2010 season was the Baltimore Ravens' 15th in the National Football League (NFL) and city of Baltimore, Maryland, the 13th to host home games at M&T Bank Stadium and their 3rd under head coach John Harbaugh. They played in the NFL's American Football Conference (AFC) North Division. The franchise improved from their 9–7 record from their previous season, with a 12–4 record, but had to settle for a wild card berth for the third straight year since Pittsburgh owned the tiebreaker for divisional record. As the AFC's #5 seed, the Ravens travelled to the #4 seeded Kansas City Chiefs defeated them soundly 30–7 in the Wild Card playoffs to advance. The following week however, the Ravens lost to their division rival and eventual AFC Champion Pittsburgh Steelers in the Divisional playoffs despite having a 21–7 lead at halftime.

Off-season
Because the Ravens made an appearance in the 2009–10 playoffs, they will be able to sign any player with a salary of $4,925,000 or more. They also may sign an unlimited number of players with a first-year salary of no more than $3,275,000, who will be restricted to an annual increase of a maximum 30 percent in the following years. However, along with the other final eight contenders from the playoffs, the Ravens will be restricted to signing new players until at least one of their free agents is signed to another franchise.

Roster signings
All signings were to the active roster, except where otherwise noted.

Roster releases

Changes to coaching staff

2010 NFL Draft

The Ravens finished with the worst record among teams exiting the playoffs in the divisional round, meaning that they will pick 25th overall. The Ravens traded their third and fourth round picks to the Arizona Cardinals to acquire wide receiver Anquan Boldin and a fifth round pick. The Ravens traded their seventh round pick to the Tampa Bay Buccaneers along with a sixth round pick in 2009 to acquire defensive lineman Marques Douglas. On the day of the draft, the Ravens traded away their first round pick to the Denver Broncos in exchange for a second, third, and fourth round pick. This gave the Ravens a total of seven draft picks.

Personnel

Staff

Final roster

Schedule

Preseason
The Ravens' preseason schedule was announced on March 31, 2010.

Regular season

Postseason

Standings

Division

Conference

Game summaries

Regular season

Week 1: at New York Jets

The Ravens began their season at New Meadowlands Stadium for an AFC duel with the New York Jets. Baltimore trailed early in the first quarter after quarterback Joe Flacco was sacked and fumbled on his first offensive play of the game. However, the Ravens' defense was able to hold the Jets to a 23-yard field goal from kicker Nick Folk. Folk kicked another field goal, from 28 yards, in the second quarter after a fumble by running back Willis McGahee. After that, the Ravens replied and took the lead when McGahee completed a 1-yard touchdown run. At the end of the first half, the Ravens led 7–6. The Ravens extended their lead in the third quarter when kicker Billy Cundiff got a 25-yard field goal. The Jets cut the lead in the fourth quarter when Folk kicked a field goal from 48 yards, making the score 10–9. The Ravens' defense managed to prevent any further progress and allowed them to take the win.

With the close win, Baltimore began the season at 1–0.

Week 2: at Cincinnati Bengals

Hoping to maintain their winning streak the Ravens flew to Paul Brown Stadium for an AFC North rivalry match against the Bengals. In the 2nd quarter Baltimore trailed early as kicker Mike Nugent hit a 36 and a 30-yard field goal. In the third quarter the Ravens replied and took the lead with QB Joe Flacco completing a 31-yard TD pass to WR Derrick Mason. The Bengals replied when Nugent hit a 46-yard field goal. The Ravens took the lead back in the fourth quarter when kicker Billy Cundiff got a 38-yard field goal, but it was cut off by Nugent's 38 and 25-yard field goal, giving Baltimore a loss.

With the loss, Baltimore fell to 1–1.

Week 3: vs. Cleveland Browns

The Ravens' next match was an AFC North rivalry match against the Browns at home. In the 1st quarter the Ravens trailed early when kicker Phil Dawson made a 28-yard field goal, but got the lead back after QB Joe Flacco found WR Anquan Boldin on an 8 and a 12-yard TD pass. After that the Ravens fell behind when RB Peyton Hillis made a 1-yard TD run, followed in the 4th quarter by QB Seneca Wallace completing a 1-yard TD pass to TE Benjamin Watson. Then the Ravens replied and took the lead when Flacco made a 27-yard TD pass to WR Anquan Boldin, followed by kicker Billy Cundiff nailing a 49-yard field goal.

With the win, the Ravens improved to 2–1.

Week 4: at Pittsburgh Steelers

Coming off their divisional home win over the Browns, the Ravens flew to Heinz Field for their Week 4 duel with the Pittsburgh Steelers, in their 3rd straight divisional game.

Baltimore would trail early as Steelers running back Rashard Mendenhall picked up a 1-yard touchdown run. The Ravens would take the lead in the second quarter as running back Willis McGahee got a 9-yard touchdown run, followed by kicker Billy Cundiff making a 33-yard field goal. After a scoreless third quarter, Pittsburgh would get the lead again as Mendenhall made a 7-yard touchdown run in the fourth quarter. Fortunately, Baltimore was able to go back ahead as quarterback Joe Flacco completed an 18-yard touchdown pass to wide receiver T. J. Houshmandzadeh with 32 seconds remaining in regulation. Middle linebacker Ray Lewis intercepted Pittsburgh backup quarterback Charlie Batch on the Steelers' final possession to end the game.

With the win, the Ravens improved to 3–1.

Week 5: vs. Denver Broncos

Hoping to increase their winning streak the Ravens played on home ground for an AFC duel with the Broncos. In the first quarter the Ravens took the early lead with QB Joe Flacco scrambling 1 yard to the endzone for a touchdown, followed in the 2nd quarter by RB Ray Rice getting a 1-yard TD run. Then kicker Billy Cundiff got a 37-yard field goal. The lead was narrowed when QB Kyle Orton made a 42-yard TD pass to WR Brandon Lloyd, but the Ravens scored again at the beginning of the 4th quarter with Rice getting another 1-yard TD run. The Broncos replied with kicker Matt Prater hitting a 38-yard field goal, but RB Willis McGahee got a 30-yard TD run to put the Ravens ahead 31–10. The Broncos made the final score of the game with Orton finding Lloyd again on a 44-yard TD pass.

With the win, the Ravens improved to 4–1.

Week 6: at New England Patriots

Hoping to increase their winning streak the Ravens flew to Gillette Stadium for an AFC duel with the Patriots. In the 1st quarter the Ravens got the early lead as kicker Billy Cundiff got a 26-yard field goal, but fell behind with RB BenJarvus Green-Ellis making a 2-yard TD run. The Ravens got the lead back when QB Joe Flacco made a 16-yard TD pass to TE Todd Heap, followed in the third quarter by Flacco finding WR Anquan Boldin on a 25-yard TD pass. The Patriots replied with kicker Stephen Gostkowski getting a 38-yard field goal, but the Ravens continued to score with Cundiff making a 25-yard field goal. The Patriots rallied with QB Tom Brady making a 5-yard TD pass to WR Deion Branch. This was followed by Gostkowski making a 24-yard field goal and then a 35-yard field goal in overtime to give the Ravens their second loss of the season.

With the loss, the Ravens fell to 4–2.

Week 7: vs. Buffalo Bills

Hoping to rebound from their loss to the Patriots the Ravens played on home ground for an AFC duel with the Bills. It was Ed Reed's first game of the season following an absence from injury, a game in which he would intercept two passes. In the 1st quarter the Ravens took the lead as kicker Billy Cundiff made a 41-yard field goal. But they trailed with QB Ryan Fitzpatrick completing a 33-yard TD pass to WR Lee Evans, followed by kicker Rian Lindell hitting a 21-yard field goal. The lead was increased in the second quarter with Fitzpatrick finding WR Stevie Johnson on a 33-yard TD pass. The Ravens replied with QB Joe Flacco making a 26-yard TD pass to TE Todd Heap. But Fitzpatrick found Evans again on a 20-yard TD pass to put the Bills up 24–10. The lead was narrowed when Cundiff hit a 48-yard field goal, followed by Flacco throwing a 14-yard TD pass to Heap. In the third quarter, the Bills had possession first, but their first play was a pass to that was intercepted by Ed Reed. On the next play, the Ravens got the lead back with Flacco completing a 34-yard TD pass to WR Anquan Boldin, followed by RB Willis McGahee getting a 2-yard TD run. The Bills managed to tie the game in the 4th quarter with Fitzpatrick making a 17-yard TD pass to Evans, and with Lindell getting a 50-yard field goal. In overtime, the Buffalo offense was driving in their own territory when after catching a pass, Ray Lewis stripped the ball from the receiver before he was down on contact. Soon after, the Bills were called for an unsportsmanlike conduct penalty of 15 yards, thereby placing the Ravens within Cundiff's comfortable range. A few plays later, including a 5-yard penalty, Cundiff successfully put the game away a 38-yard field goal to give the Ravens the win.

With the win, the Ravens went into their bye week at 5–2.

Week 9: vs. Miami Dolphins

Coming off their bye week the Ravens played on home ground for an AFC duel with the Dolphins. The Ravens took the lead after QB Joe Flacco completed a 32-yard TD pass to RB Willis McGahee. The Dolphins replied with RB Ronnie Brown getting a 12-yard TD run. The Ravens got the lead back after kicker Billy Cundiff made a 26 and a 39-yard field goal. The Dolphins narrowed the lead with kicker Dan Carpenter nailing a 19-yard field goal. The Ravens took control after Flacco found WR Derrick Mason on a 12-yard TD pass. This was followed in the 4th quarter by Cundiff hitting a 20 and a 24-yard field goal.
The Ravens in this game were the 3rd team in NFL history to have a game without a turnover or have to punt.

With the win, the Ravens improve to 6–2.

Week 10: at Atlanta Falcons

Coming off their home win over the Dolphins, the Ravens flew to the Georgia Dome for a Week 10 interconference duel with the throwback-cladded Atlanta Falcons on Thursday night. After a scoreless first quarter, Baltimore trailed in the second quarter as Falcons quarterback Matt Ryan completed a 28-yard touchdown pass to running back Jason Snelling, followed by kicker Matt Bryant making a 28-yard field goal.

Atlanta added onto their lead in the third quarter with Bryant's 51-yard field goal, yet the Ravens answered with quarterback Joe Flacco found wide receiver Anquan Boldin on a 5-yard touchdown pass. The Falcons struck back in the fourth quarter as Ryan completed a 4-yard touchdown pass to wide receiver Roddy White. Baltimore took the lead as Flacco hooked up with wide receiver Derrick Mason on a 6-yard touchdown pass, followed by finding tight end Todd Heap on a 9-yard touchdown pass. However, Atlanta got the last laugh as Ryan completed a 33-yard touchdown pass to White (with a failed two-point conversion).

With the loss, the Ravens fell to 6–3.

Week 11: at Carolina Panthers

Hoping to rebound from their loss to the Falcons the Ravens flew to Bank of America Stadium for an inter-conference duel with the Panthers. In the first quarter the Ravens took the early lead with quarterback Joe Flacco getting a 56-yard TD pass to wide receiver T. J. Houshmandzadeh. This was followed by kicker Billy Cundiff nailing a 22-yard field goal. The Panthers replied with kicker John Kasay making a 45-yard field goal, but the Ravens increased their lead with RB Ray Rice getting a 1-yard TD run, followed in the third quarter by Cundiff hitting a 33-yard field goal. The lead was narrowed when Kasay made a 40-yard field goal. This was followed by quarterback Brian St. Pierre completing an 88-yard TD pass to wide receiver David Gettis. The Ravens took further command with Cundiff hitting a 49-yard field goal. The Ravens then scored two defensive touchdowns in 11 seconds with an interception by safety Ed Reed that was lateraled to safety Dawan Landry who returned it for a touchdown, followed by Ray Lewis returning another interception 24 yards for a touchdown.

With the win, the Ravens improved to 7–3.

Week 12: vs. Tampa Bay Buccaneers

The Ravens were facing the Tampa Bay Buccaneers, a team with an identical 7–3 record. However, the Ravens were considered favorites going into the game, given that they had never lost at home during the season, and all Tampa Bay wins were against teams with losing records. Still, they did not take this one lightly. After a scoreless first quarter, the Ravens scored first with a field goal. Tampa Bay later tied it, but Baltimore scored two touchdowns, including one on a 65-yard pass from Todd Heap, to have a 17–3 halftime lead. During a scoreless third quarter, a would be long TD-run from Ray Rice was negated by a controversial call of a penalty on Anquan Boldin. Though the Ravens would never score anymore in the game, they managed to hold off Tampa Bay and allow just one touchdown, enough to prevent their lead from being blown.

Week 13: vs. Pittsburgh Steelers

Coming off their win over the Buccaneers, the Ravens stayed at home for a Week 13 AFC North rematch with the Pittsburgh Steelers on Sunday night. Baltimore delivered the game's opening strike in the first quarter as quarterback Joe Flacco found wide receiver Anquan Boldin on a 14-yard touchdown pass. After a scoreless second quarter, the Steelers responded with kicker Shaun Suisham got a 45-yard field goal. The Ravens would answer with a 24-yard field goal from kicker Billy Cundiff. Pittsburgh would get another field goal in the fourth quarter, a 19-yarder by Suisham. In the final minutes of the game, the Ravens were driving, trying to run down the clock, when Troy Polamalu sacked Flacco, forcing a fumble in the process. The Steelers recovered the fumble and returned it to the Ravens' 9-yard line. Two plays later, quarterback Ben Roethlisberger completed a 9-yard touchdown pass to running back Isaac Redman. Baltimore tried to rally, but the Steelers' defense held on to preserve the win.

With the loss, the Ravens fell to 8–4.

Week 14: at Houston Texans

Hoping to rebound from their loss to the Steelers, the Ravens flew to Reliant Stadium for a Week 14 Monday night duel with the Houston Texans. Baltimore delivered the game's opening strike with a 1-yard touchdown run from running back Willis McGahee. The Ravens added onto their lead in the second quarter as quarterback Joe Flacco found wide receiver Derrick Mason on a 9-yard and a 26-yard touchdown pass. The Texans answered with quarterback Matt Schaub completing a 46-yard touchdown pass to wide receiver Andre Johnson.

Baltimore struck back to open the third quarter with rookie wide receiver David Reed returning the second half's opening kickoff 103 yards for a touchdown. Houston responded with kicker Neil Rackers making a 24-yard and a 42-yard field goal. The Texans tied the game in the fourth quarter as Schaub completed a 7-yard touchdown pass to wide receiver Jacoby Jones, a 5-yard touchdown pass to Johnson, and a successful two-point conversion pass to Jones. In overtime, the Ravens got the win as cornerback Josh Wilson returned a 12-yard interception for a touchdown.

With the win, Baltimore improved to 9–4.

Week 15: vs. New Orleans Saints

Hoping to beat the defending Super Bowl champs, the Ravens returned home. New Orleans struck first with an 18-yard pass from Drew Brees to Jimmy Graham, but Baltimore quickly answered with Flacco throwing a 34-yard pass to Ed Dickson. The Ravens then followed with two touchdowns, both by Ray Rice, one rushing (10 yards) and one passing (17 yards), to bring the score up 21–7. At the close of the half, the Saints scored on a 1-yard pass to Graham to bring the halftime score to 21–14. The Saints kicked a field goal to enter the third quarter to make it 21–17, but the Ravens quickly answered that with a field goal to make it 24–17. The Saints tied it in the fourth quarter on a 15-yard touchdown pass to Lance Moore in the corner of the end zone, a play that was challenged by Baltimore but not overturned. The Ravens managed to get ahead with a Billy Cundiff field goal with 10:03 remaining 27–24.The Saints had the ball in the final minutes backed up near their own end zone when Drew Brees threw an interception to Cory Redding to give Baltimore a chance to run off the clock. Though there was not enough time to run off the entire clock, Baltimore managed to leave just 9 seconds as they kicked a field goal to make it 30–24. The Saints had one last chance on their kickoff return in which they pitched it around in hopes of a touchdown, but they were stopped. They were also called for a moot penalty for a forward pass that would have rendered any drive at this point null.

Overall, the game was highlighted by Ray Rice's 153 yards rushing and two touchdowns, Billy Cundiff's two field goals, and the Redding interception that virtually ended the game.

With the win, the Ravens went to 10–4, nearly clinching a playoff berth.

Week 16: at Cleveland Browns

The Ravens entered the game knowing that if they would win, they would be guaranteed a playoff spot for the third year in a row. Also hoping to make it three straight wins and six straight overall against the Browns, the Ravens faced their AFC North rivalry. Despite the team's losing record, the Ravens took the game very seriously and were especially concerned about running back Peyton Hillis, who had run all over the team earlier in the year.

In the first quarter the Ravens trailed early as Mohamed Massaquoi threw a 29-yard TD pass to WR Brian Robiskie. Baltimore challenged this play, doubting that a catch was really made in the end zone, but the ruling was upheld. But Baltimore would answer quickly. First, kicker Billy Cundiff nailed a 27-yard field goal. On the following Cleveland possession, the Ravens forced and recovered a fumble, followed by QB Joe Flacco completing a 15-yard TD pass to T. J. Houshmandzadeh. Later, Ed Reed intercepted a pass, the second Browns interception of the game, leading to a 40-yard Cundiff field goal. The lead was narrowed when kicker Phil Dawson got a 30-yard field goal at the end of the half. The Ravens cushioned their lead early in the third quarter with Flacco getting a 22-yard TD pass to WR Derrick Mason, making the score 20–10, as it would conclude.

With the win, the Ravens improved to 11–4, and were able to clinch their first third consecutive playoff berth.

Week 17: vs. Cincinnati Bengals

The Ravens' sixteenth game was a division rivalry rematch against the Bengals at home. The Ravens led the game as kicker Billy Cundiff hit a 25 and a 47-yard field goal. This was followed by Ray Rice getting a 7-yard TD run. The lead was narrowed with QB Carson Palmer throwing an 11-yard TD pass to WR Jerome Simpson, but the Ravens held on for the win, closing out the regular season with a 12–4 record. The Ravens entered the game with a guaranteed playoff spot but knowing that if they won and the Steelers lost, they would improve their playoff position in the conference from #5 to #2. While it was presumed Pittsburgh would probably beat the Browns, they were determined to play well.

The Ravens took advantage during the game on turnovers, having forced five in the game. After winning the coin toss and electing to defer, Carson Palmer threw an early interception to Ed Reed, giving the Ravens possession. This resulted in a field goal, giving the Ravens an early 3–0 lead. In the second quarter, Cundiff kicked a second field goal, making it 6–0. At the closing of the first half, the Bengals were driving toward the end zone when Reed made his second interception of the half, thereby preventing the opposition from scoring and sealing a first-half shutout. In the third quarter, the Ravens recovered a fumble from deep within Bengals territory, leading to a Ray Rice touchdown run, making the score 13–0. The only Bengals score was a touchdown in the fourth quarter. The Bengals had some chances toward the end. One drive in the final minutes ended as a turnover on downs, another when Palmer fumbled. But the Cincinnati's defense forced three-and-outs each time. The Bengals' final chance came with no timeout and 45 seconds from deep within their own territory, when they were able to play hurry-up offense and drive the ball to within a few yards of the end zone. But they failed to score, resulting in another turnover on downs with just 10 seconds remaining.

With Pittsburgh winning, the Ravens did not gain anything in the playoff standings. Nevertheless, they finished the season 12–4, tied for their second best season (the other being their 2000 Super Bowl winning season) just a game behind their winningest season in 2006 when they finished 13–3.

Postseason

AFC Wild Card Round: at Kansas City Chiefs

Entering the postseason as the AFC's #5 seed, the Ravens began their playoff run at Arrowhead Stadium for the AFC Wild Card Round against the #4 Kansas City Chiefs. Baltimore delivered the game's opening strike with a 19-yard field goal from kicker Billy Cundiff, but the Chiefs answered with running back Jamaal Charles getting a 41-yard touchdown run. The Ravens regained the lead in the second quarter as quarterback Joe Flacco found running back Ray Rice on a 9-yard touchdown pass.

Baltimore added onto their lead in the third quarter with a pair of 29-yard field goals from Cundiff, followed by Flacco connecting with wide receiver Anquan Boldin on a 4-yard touchdown pass. In the fourth quarter, the Ravens pulled away with a 25-yard touchdown run from running back Willis McGahee. This occurred on an offensive drive that burned more than 10 minutes from the clock, nearly sealing a victory.

On Kansas City's final offensive drive, an incomplete pass was followed by two sacks of Matt Cassel. On fourth down, Cassel threw an interception, allowing Baltimore to gain one more first down and then run out the clock.

With the win, Baltimore improved their overall record to 13–4.

AFC Divisional Round: at Pittsburgh Steelers

Coming off their win over the Chiefs, the Ravens flew to Heinz Field for the AFC Divisional Round against their AFC North rival, the #2 Pittsburgh Steelers, for the third time in the season. Baltimore trailed early as Steelers running back Rashard Mendenhall got a 1-yard touchdown run. The Ravens took the lead with a 14-yard touchdown run from running back Ray Rice, followed by a 13-yard fumble return for a touchdown from defensive end Cory Redding. Baltimore added onto their lead in the second quarter as quarterback Joe Flacco found tight end Todd Heap on a 4-yard touchdown pass which gave the Ravens a 21–7 lead at the half.

Pittsburgh struck back and tied the game taking advantage of a few Ravens turnovers. Two quick touchdowns were scored as quarterback Ben Roethlisberger completed a 9-yard touchdown pass to tight end Heath Miller, followed by an 8-yard touchdown pass to wide receiver Hines Ward. The Steelers retook the lead with kicker Shaun Suisham making a 35-yard field goal, yet the Ravens tied the game with a 24-yard field goal from Cundiff. On the Steelers final possession, they converted on a crucial 3rd and 19 with the game tied at 24 to keep their drive alive. Eventually, Pittsburgh got the last score with Mendenhall's 1-yard touchdown run.

With the loss, Baltimore's season came to an end with an overall record of 13–5.

References

External links

Baltimore
Baltimore Ravens seasons
2010 in sports in Maryland
2010s in Baltimore